TGV 001 (Train à Grande Vitesse 001 ) was a high-speed railway train built in France. It was the first TGV prototype and was commissioned in 1969, to begin testing in 1972.
The experimental train was part of a vast research program on high rail speeds. This program covered all technical aspects, principally traction, the behaviour of the vehicles, braking, aerodynamics and signalling. Originally, two trains were to be built, but only one was produced. The second was to be a tilting train equipped with an active tilting system, but was abandoned owing to technical difficulties.

Description
This turbotrain was built in a radically different fashion than its predecessors (the ETG and the RTG); it was composed of two locomotives and three carriages, all with driving axles. This concept as well as the shape of the TGV 001 was kept when designing the future TGV.

Each axle was equipped with a traction motor with the advantage of small weight per axle but maximum power. Electric traction permitted dynamic braking, particularly effective at high speeds. Each locomotive was equipped with two Turbomeca Turmo turbines (TURMO III G then TURMO X), also used in the Super Frelon helicopters. As well as having direct control of the turbines, the locomotives were equipped with traction, braking and signalling controls.

The TGV 001 was an articulated train; each carriage shared one bogie with the next. This setup ensured greater stability and permitted the suspension to be placed near the centre of gravity of each carriage, thus reducing rolling in curves.

Service

History
TGV 001 was finished on 24 March 1972 and began to undergo testing on 4 April 1972.  It went on to carry out 5227 test runs, running   and breaking the  barrier 175 times.

The 1973 oil crisis caused a sharp increase in the price of oil, after which it was deemed impractical to use oil to power the TGV, and the project turned to electric traction.

Tests officially concluded on 19 June 1978.

Preservation
T 001 : Bischheim (Bas-Rhin) 
T 002 : Belfort (Territoire de Belfort)

See also
Turbotrain
Gas turbine-electric locomotive
Gas turbine train
SNCF
British Rail APT-E

External links

45 ans de TGV

High-speed trains of France
Land speed record rail vehicles
001
Gas turbine multiple units of France
Gas turbine multiple units with locomotive-like power cars
Experimental and prototype high-speed trains